Moussa Seybou Kassey (1959 – 27 April 2020) was a Nigerien politician who served as Minister of Public Service and Labor. He was Spokesperson of the government under Prime Minister Hama Amadou from 17 September 2001 to 30 December 2004.

Biography
Kassey studied as an economist, and published the book La politique de planification urbaine au Niger : le cas de Niamey. He was chairman of the Mouvement Patriotique pour la Solidarité et le Progrès, a political party in Niger.

From 2014 until his death in 2020, he was Director General of the Caisse Autonome des Retraites du Niger, an autonomous body which handled financial management of pensions for Nigerien military personnel.

Kassey died on 27 April 2020.

References

Nigerien politicians
1959 births
2020 deaths